Huang Hongjia (5 August 1924 – 22 September 2021) was a Chinese scientist. He was an academician of the Chinese Academy of Sciences (CAS), and a professor at Shanghai University.

Life and career
Huang developed coupling wave theory in the field of microwave theory. He led a research team that successfully developed single-mode optical fibers in 1980.

He died on 22 September 2021, at the age of 97.

Bibliography
 "Coupling Mode and Imperfect Waveguide", New York Institute of Technology (thesis), 1981.
 "Coupled Mode Theory", 1984.
 "Microwave approach to highly-irregular fiber optics", Wiley and Sons, 1997.

References

1924 births
2021 deaths
20th-century Chinese inventors
Educators from Hunan
Members of the Chinese Academy of Sciences
National Southwestern Associated University alumni
People from Changde
Scientists from Hunan
Academic staff of Shanghai University